Ronen Shoval (born 1980 in Ramat Hasharon) is an Israeli thinker & writer associate to the right-wing. Shoval is the Dean of the Tikvah Fund and head of the Argaman Institute.

He is the founder of the extra-parliamentary movement Im Tirtzu, and presided as its first chairman (2007–2013). Ronen is the author of the book Herzl's Vision 2.0, a manifest for the rejuvenating Zionism (Im Tirtzu, Kochav M'Israel). He is a columnist in the Israeli newspaper Israel-Hayom and previously wrote in Haaretz, Maariv and Makor Rishon. He was a lecturer at Bar-Ilan University, at a pre-army mechina (a preparatory program), and at other colleges in Israel. He was also a research associate at the Institute for Zionist Strategies. He was elected a board member of the World Zionist Organization, the Jewish Agency and Keren Hayesod. In 2013, Ronen was named by the Algemeiner Journal as one of the 100 people who had the biggest positive impact on Jewish life in 2012.
 
In January 2015, Shoval, running as a candidate in Habayit Hayehudi's primary, called for an investigation into editors at Haaretz, accusing them of "defeatist propaganda" prohibited under Statute 103 of Israel's penal code. In response to Shoval's accusations on Facebook, multiple death threats against Haaretz editors were posted, which Shoval promised to remove. The Haaretz cartoon that sparked the death threats said "10 journalists killed in attack on Charlie Hebdo in Paris, about 13 journalists killed last summer in attack on Gaza" and "JeSuisGaza" below JeSuisCharlie.

Ronen holds a B.A in international relations and an M.A in Jewish Philosophy from the Hebrew University. He earned a PhD in Jewish political thought from the Paris West University Nanterre La Défense (graduating summa cum laude, mentored by Prof. Shmuel Trigano). Ronen is married, and has five children.

References

Israeli Jews
Israeli writers
Hebrew University of Jerusalem Faculty of Social Sciences alumni
Far-right politics
Living people
1980 births